Yuri Pavlovich Falin (2 April 1937, in Moscow – 3 November 2003, in Moscow) was a Soviet football player.

Honours
 Soviet Top League winner: 1960, 1962.
 Soviet Cup winner: 1960, 1963, 1965.

International career
Falin made his debut for USSR on May 18, 1958 in a friendly against England. He played for USSR at the 1958 FIFA World Cup.

External links
  Profile

1937 births
2003 deaths
Russian footballers
Soviet footballers
Soviet Union international footballers
1958 FIFA World Cup players
FC Torpedo Moscow players
FC Spartak Moscow players
FC Kairat players
FC Shinnik Yaroslavl players
Soviet Top League players
Expatriate footballers in Kazakhstan
Russian expatriate sportspeople in Kazakhstan
Burials in Troyekurovskoye Cemetery
Association football forwards 
Association football midfielders